Lee Tae-bok (11 December 1950 – 3 December 2021) was a South Korean politician. He served as Minister of Health and Welfare from January to July 2002.

References

1950 births
2021 deaths
South Korean politicians
Health and Welfare ministers of South Korea
People from Boryeong